This is a list of aviation-related events from 1926:

Events 
 Award of the Harmon Trophy begins. A set of three trophies is awarded annually to the worlds outstanding aviator, aviatrix (female aviator), and aeronaut (balloon or dirigible aviator) for the year, and a fourth trophy (the National Trophy) is awarded to the outstanding aviator for the year in each of the 21 member countries of the International League of Aviators.
 Fiat acquires the Società Anonima Aeronautica Ansaldo aircraft manufacturing subsidiary from the Gio. Ansaldo & C. shipbuilding company and combines it with its own Società Italiana Aviazione subsidiary to form a new Società Anonima Aeronautica d'Italia subsidiary for the design and production of aircraft.
 The first known reforestation of land by aircraft is carried by airplanes operating from Wheeler Field on Oahu in the Territory of Hawaii.
 Harold Frederick Pitcairn founds the Pitcairn Aircraft Company. It later will become the Autogiro Company of America.

January
 January 6 – Deutsche Luft Hansa is formed by the merger of Deutscher Aero Lloyd and Junkers Luftverkehr.
 January 22 – A Spanish four-man crew led by Spanish Air Force Major Ramón Franco – the brother of future Spanish dictator Francisco Franco – and including Captain Julio Ruiz de Alda Miqueleiz takes off from the Rio Tinto at Palos de Moguer, Spain, to begin a seven-stop flight to Buenos Aires, Argentina, in the Dornier Do J Wal ("Whale") flying boat Plus Ultra ("Farther Still"). After flying low past the Christopher Columbus Monument in Huelva, Spain, they make an uneventful 806-mile (1,298-km) flight to their first stop at Las Palmas in the Canary Islands.
 January 26 – Ramón Franco and his crew complete the second leg of their Spain-to-Buenos Aires flight, flying  from Las Palmas in the Canary Islands to Porto Praia in the Cape Verde Islands in 9 hours 50 minutes.
It is the second-longest nonstop flight in history – exceeded only by a 1,890-mile North Atlantic Ocean crossing in a Vickers Vimy on 14-15 June 1919 by John Alcock and Arthur Whitten Brown – and they become the first aviators to cross the South Atlantic Ocean using only one aircraft. Rough weather forces them to spend the night on their flying boat Plus Ultra before they can dock at Fernando de Noronha.
 January 31 – Forced to throw their gear and luggage overboard to remain airborne after an in-flight engine failure, Ramón Franco and his crew complete the fourth leg of their Spain-to-Buenos Aires flight, flying  from Fernando de Noronha to Recife, Brazil, where they receive a hero's welcome.

February
 February 4 – Spanish Air Force Major Ramón Franco, copilot/navigator Captain Julio Ruiz de Alda Miqueleiz, and their crew complete the fifth leg of their Spain-to-Buenos Aires flight in the Dornier Do J Wal ("Whale") flying boat Plus Ultra ("Farther Still"), flying  from Recife, Brazil, to Rio de Janeiro, Brazil, in 12 hours 16 minutes. Franco is at the controls for the entire flight. So many boats meet them that they have difficulty landing in Guanabara Bay without colliding with one.
 February 9 – Ramón Franco and his crew complete the sixth leg of their Spain-to-Buenos Aires flight, flying  from Rio de Janeiro, Brazil, to Montevideo, Uruguay, in 12 hours 5 minutes.
 February 10 – Ramón Franco and his crew complete their Spain-to-Buenos Aires flight, flying the journey's seventh leg, a  flight from Montevideo, Uruguay, to Buenos Aires, Argentina, where they receive another welcome by exuberant crowds. Over 20 days, they have completed the 6,300-mile (10,145-km) trip from Spain in just under 51 hours of flying time, a considerable achievement for the time. Franco's plans to fly back to Spain in Plus Ultra via Chile, Mexico, Cuba, and the Azores will be cancelled when the Government of Spain opts to present the plane to the Government of Argentina as a gift. Plus Ultra'''′s crew instead will return to Spain aboard the Argentine Navy protected cruiser Buenos Aires as Spanish national heroes. 
He is the second U.S. overnight mail service pilot to die on duty.

March
 March 1 – Four Royal Air Force Fairey IIIDs begin a long-distance flight, taking them from Cairo to Cape Town and then on to Lee-on-Solent, England, where they will arrive on June 2.
 March 16 – Robert Goddard launches the first liquid-fuelled rocket near Auburn, Massachusetts.
 March 24 – The Cierva Autogiro Company is founded in the United Kingdom.

April
 April 1 – The Italian airline Società Italiana Servizi Aerei begins operations linking Trieste, Venice, Pavia, and Turin with CANT 10 flying boats.
 April 6 – Varney Speed Lines begins operations in the US. It will later become Continental Airlines.
 April 7 – The Italian airline Società Anonima Navigazione Aerea (SANA) begins fight operations, offering flying boat service on the Genoa-Rome-Naples-Palermo route.
 April 10 – Three United States Army Air Service aircraft take photographs of an eruption of Mauna Loa volcano on the island of Hawaii, providing valuable scientific information.
 April 17 – Western Air Express (the future Western Airlines) begins operations with a contract mail flight from Salt Lake City, Utah, to Los Angeles, California, using a Douglas M-2. The airline will begin passenger services a month later.
 April 30 – Bessie Coleman, the first licensed African-American female pilot, is killed along with mechanic William Wills, who was piloting the plane, after they crash as a result of a wrench that Wills accidentally left loose getting stuck in the control gears.

May
 May 1 – Deutsche Luft Hansa begins the first night passenger airline service, with domestic flights in Germany between Berlin and Königsberg employing Junkers G 24 aircraft.
 May 4 – The Stinson Aircraft Corporation is incorporated.
 May 9 - Richard Byrd and Floyd Bennett make the first flight over the North Pole in a Fokker VIIa-3m.
 May 11–14 - Roald Amundsen makes the first airship flight over the North Pole. The Norge leaves Spitzbergen and arrives in Teller, Alaska three days later.
 May 20 – The Air Commerce Act becomes law in the United States. It creates an Aeronautics Branch within the United States Department of Commerce, vesting that entity with regulatory powers to ensure civil air safety, including testing and licensing pilots, issuing certificates to guarantee the airworthiness of aircraft, making and enforcing safety rules, certifying aircraft, establishing airways, operating and maintaining aids to air navigation, and investigating accidents and incidents in aviation. It also directs that airways in the United States be charted for the first time, and assigns the responsibility to chart them to the United States Coast and Geodetic Survey.

June
 June 20 - The United States Coast Guard opens the first permanent Coast Guard Air Stations.Coast Guard Aviation History.
 June 26 - Flying a Potez 28, Ludovic Arrachart and his brother Paul depart Paris.
 June 30 - Alan Cobham sets out on a round trip from England to Australia in a de Havilland DH.50. He will arrive back in London on October 1 and receive a knighthood for his accomplishment.

July
 July 2
 The United States Army Air Service becomes the United States Army Air Corps.
 In accordance with the redesignation of its parent service, the Air Service Tactical School at Langley Field, Virginia, is renamed the Air Corps Tactical School.
 July 24 - Two Deutsche Luft Hansa Junkers G.24s leave Berlin to make a round-trip to Beijing. They will return on September 26.
 July 26 - During United States Navy experiments with the operation of seaplanes from a submarine equipped with an aircraft hangar, the submarine  carries out for the first time a full cycle of surfacing, removing the disassembled seaplane from its hangar, assembling it, launching it, retrieving it, disassembling it, stowing in its hangar, and submerging, on the Thames River at New London, Connecticut.

August
 August 18 – Flying in bad weather on a scheduled passenger flight from Paris-Le Bourget Airport outside Paris to Croydon Airport in London with 15 people aboard, the Air Union Blériot 155 F-AIEB Wilbur Wright strikes the roof of a barn and crashes into haystacks near Hurst, Kent, south of Lympne Airport, killing its two crew members and two of its 13 passengers.Aviation Safety Network: Accident Description

September
 September 10–17 – The Daily Mail sponsors the third and final light airplane trials at Lympne Aerodrome in Lympne, England. A Hawker Cygnet flown by George Bulman wins. Flying an Avro 581 Avian, Bert Hinkler takes second place in three of the six trials before withdrawing with magneto problems.
 September 21 – Hoping to win the Orteig Prize, French World War I ace René Fonck attempts to take off from Roosevelt Field on Long Island, New York, in a severely overloaded Sikorsky S-35 for a nonstop transatlantic flight to Paris. The aircraft loses a wheel on takeoff, fails to gain lift, cartwheels off a bluff, and bursts into flames, killing two of its crew. Fonck survives.
 September 26 – The French aviators Dieudonné Costes and René de Vitrolles fly  from Paris, France, to Assuan, Egypt, in an attempt to break the world distance record.

October
 October 2 – During a scheduled passenger flight from Paris-Le Bourget Airport outside Paris to Croydon Airport in London, the Air Union Blériot 155 F-AICQ Clément Ader experiences an in-flight engine fire and attempts an emergency landing at Leigh, Kent. It crashes and is consumed by fire, killing all seven people on board.
It generally is considered the birth of modern dive bombing.Smith, Peter C., Dive Bomber!, Annapolis, Maryland: Naval Institute Press, 1982, pp. 23-24.
 October 28 – The French aviators Dieudonné Costes and J. Rignot break the world distance record, flying  from Paris, France, to Jask, Persia, as a part of  Paris-India-Paris flight.

November
 November 6 – Italo Balbo becomes Italy′s Secretary of State for Air.
 November 13 - The 1926 Schneider Trophy race is flown at Hampton Roads, Virginia, in the United States.
 November 15 - T. Neville Stack and B. S. Leete leave England in an attempt to reach India by air in a de Havilland DH.60. They will arrive in Karachi on January 8, 1927.
 November 17 - Mario de Bernardi breaks his four-day-old world speed record, reaching  in the same Macchi M.39 at Hampton Roads, Virginia, USA.

December
 December 22 - Bert Hinkler and John F. Leeming, flying an Avro 585 Gosport biplane G-EBPH, successfully land on and take off from the summit of Helvellyn in England.

 First flights 
 Avro 571 Buffalo
 Boulton Paul Sidestrand
 Cierva C.8
 Fairchild 71
 Farman F.150
 Junkers A 32
 Junkers A 35
 Junkers G 31
 Latécoère 26
 Levasseur PL.4
 Pitcairn PA-2 Sesquiwing
 Pitcairn PA-3 Orowing
 Potez 28
 Westland Westbury
 Wright-Bellanca WB-2
 c. 1926 – Mitsubishi 2MB1
 Spring 1926 – Westland Racer

January
 January 12 – Polikarpov DI-1
 January 25 – Stinson Detroiter

February
 Latécoère 25
 February 19 – Dornier N/Kawasaki Ka 87

March
 Armstrong Whitworth Argosy G-EBLFApril
 April 24 - Handley Page Harrow (HP.31)

May
 May 5 – Wright XF3W Apache
 May 7 – Blériot 127

June
 ca. June – Saunders A.3 Valkyrie
 June 11 – Ford 4-AT Trimotor
 June 14 – Fairchild FC-1, prototype of the Fairchild FC-2
 June 17 – Junkers W 33
 June 19 – Blackburn Iris
 June 26
Avro 566 Avenger
Avro Tutor

July
 Latécoère 21
 July 6 – Macchi M.39

August
 August 9 – Focke-Wulf GL 18

September
 Avro 581, prototype of the Avro Avian
 De Havilland DH.66 Hercules G-EBMWOctober
 October 25 - Spartan C3
 October 27 - Blériot 165

November
 Saunders A.4 Medina G-EBMG November 3 – Boeing XF2B-1

 Entered service 
 Levasseur PL.2 with French Naval Aviation aboard the aircraft carrier BéarnMay
 Farman F.170 Jabiru with Société Générale des Transports AériensJune
 Breguet 19 B.2 bomber variant with the 11e Régiment d'Aviation de Bombardement of the French Armys Aéronautique Militaire
 June 16 – Armstrong Whitworth Argosy G-EBLO with Imperial Airways

August
 Lioré et Olivier 21 with Air Union

September
 Martin T3M with the United States Navy

December
 SABCA S.2 with SABENA

Retirements
 Grigorovich M-24 by Soviet Naval Aviation

March
 Avro 549 Aldershot by No. 99 Squadron, Royal Air Force

References

 Taylor, H.A. Fairey Aircraft since 1915''. London:Putnam, 1988. .

 
Aviation by year